Truth and Consequences may refer to:

Literature
"Truth and Consequences", a novel in the Charmed novel series
"Truth and Consequences" a short story from the anthology Twilight Zone: 19 Original Stories on the 50th Anniversary
"Truth and Consequences", a prequel novella of the Women of the Otherworld series

Memoirs
Scotland First: Truth and Consequences, a memoir of First Minister of Scotland Henry McLeish
Truth and Consequences: The Education of Mark Rudd, a memoir of Mark Rudd

Comics
"Crashing; Truth and Consequences", an issue in the comic book series The Spectacular Spider-Man
"Truth and Consequences", the tenth and final issue of the DC Universe: Legacies comic book series

Television

Episodes titled "Truth & Consequences"
"Truth & Consequences", an episode of season 6 of Braxton Family Values
"Truth & Consequences", an episode of season 6 of Drop Dead Diva
"Truth & Consequences", an episode of season 6 of ER
"Truth & Consequences", an episode of season 2 of Heroes
"Truth & Consequences", an episode of season 2 of Love after Lockup
"Truth & Consequences", an episode of the 1991 TV series Under Cover

Episodes titled "Truth and Consequences"
"Truth and Consequences", an episode of season 1 of Army Wives
"Truth and Consequences", an episode of season 1 of Becker
"Truth and Consequences", an episode of season 4 of Beverly Hills, 90210
"Truth and Consequences", an episode of season 2 of Black Lightning
"Truth and Consequences", an episode of season 3 of Boy Meets World
"Truth and Consequences", an episode of series/season 19 of Casualty
"Truth and Consequences", an episode of season 2 of Crossing Lines
"Truth and Consequences", an episode of season 1 of the 2012 Dallas series revival
"Truth and Consequences", an episode of season 3 of Doogie Howser, M.D.
"Truth and Consequences", an episode of Fashion House
"Truth and Consequences", an episode of season 2 of Felicity
"Truth and Consequences", an episode of season 2 of Fired Up
"Truth and Consequences", an episode of Gabriel's Fire
"Truth and Consequences", an episode of season 3 of The Game
"Truth and Consequences", an episode of season 2 of the 2019 TV series Games People Play
"Truth and Consequences", an episode of season 2 of General Hospital: Night Shift
"Truth and Consequences", an episode of season 1 of the American TV series Gloria
"Truth and Consequences", an episode of the American 2013 TV drama Hostages
"Truth and Consequences", an episode of It's All Relative
"Truth and Consequences", an episode of season 2 of The Jersey
"Truth and Consequences", an episode of season 4 of Justified
"Truth and Consequences", an episode of season 6 of Knots Landing
"Truth and Consequences", an episode of season 2 of Lost Girl
"Truth and Consequences", an episode of season 5 of Nash Bridges
"Truth and Consequences", an episode of October Faction
"Truth and Consequences", an episode of season 1 of Point of Entry
"Truth and Consequences", an episode of season 2 of Polyamory: Married & Dating
"Truth and Consequences", an episode of Power Rangers Dino Thunder
"Truth and Consequences", an episode of season 2 of The Practice
"Truth and Consequences", an episode of season 5 of Providence
"Truth and Consequences", an episode of season 2 of Star Wars: The Bad Batch
"Truth and Consequences", an episode of season 2 of Suddenly Susan
"Truth and Consequences", an episode of season 2 of Superman & Lois
"Truth and Consequences", a two-part episode of season 4 of Trapper John, M.D.
"Truth and Consequences", an episode of season 2 of Yu-Gi-Oh! 5D's
"Truth and Consequences/Deceitful Truth", an episode of season 1 of Yu-Gi-Oh! VRAINS
"Last Hope; Truth and Consequences", an episode of season 19 of the The First 48

Music
"Truth and Consequences", a song composed by Newsboys